Henschel is a German surname. Notable people with the surname include:

 Alberto Henschel (1827–1882), German-Brazilian photographer
 August Wilhelm Henschel (1790–1856), German physician and botanist
 Carl Anton Henschel, the eponymous "son" founding Henschel & Son
 Christoph Henschel (born 1969), violinist with the Henschel Quartet
 Georg Christian Carl Henschel, founder of Henschel & Son
 Sir George Henschel (1850–1934), English baritone, pianist, conductor and composer
 Jane Henschel (born 1952), an American operatic mezzosoprano
 Markus Henschel (born 1969), violinist with the Henschel Quartet
 Milton George Henschel (1920-2003), member of the Governing Body of Jehovah's Witnesses and president of the Watch Tower Society
 Monika Henschel (born 1968), violist with the Henschel Quartet
 Otto Henschel (1880–1961), New York assemblyman 1914
 Wally Henschel (1893–1988), German chess player
 Wilhelm Henschel (1785-1865) German-Jewish artist, engraver, and lithographer, known for works produced together with his brothers, Friedrich, August, and Moritz Henschel, as the Henschel Brothers

See also
 Henschel (disambiguation)

German-language surnames